Lucifer and the Biscuit Hammer, known in Japan as , is a Japanese manga series written and illustrated by Satoshi Mizukami. It was serialized in Shōnen Gahōsha's seinen manga magazine Young King OURs from April 2005 to August 2010, with its chapters collected in ten tankōbon volumes. Seven Seas Entertainment published the series in North America.

An anime television series adaptation by NAZ aired from July to December 2022 on the Animeism programming block.

Plot
Yuuhi Amamiya is a young, misanthropic college student who one day wakes up to find a lizard on his bed. The lizard explains that Yuuhi has been chosen as a Beast Knight, a magical warrior destined to help a princess defeat a mage seeking to destroy the world with a giant mallet floating in space called the Biscuit Hammer. While Yuuhi initially is not interested in getting involved, he changes his mind when he meets the princess, Samidare Asahina, who tells him her intent to defeat the mage and save the world so she can destroy it herself.

Characters

The Beast Knights

Yuuhi is the Lizard Knight. A misanthropic college student, he ultimately agrees to save the Earth so Samidare can destroy it instead.

Samidare is the princess of the Beast Knights who serves as Anima's vessel. She secretly wants to destroy the planet herself. 

Hangetsu is the Dog Knight. He is a martial arts expert who wants to be a hero of justice. 

Mikazuki is the Crow Knight who is a college student and Hangetsu's younger brother. While he normally has a friendly and outgoing personality, he becomes obsessed with fighting once he comes across a worthy opponent. 

Souichirou is the Horse Knight. He was a detective prior to being a Beast Knight. He serves as a fatherly figure for the knights and is fiercely protective of the younger members.  

Yayoi is the Snake Knight. She is a kind woman who is skilled at swordplay and is into anime, manga, and cosplay. She develops feelings for Yuuhi after he rescues her.

Taiyou is the Owl Knight. He is a young boy who is withdrawn and estranged from his family.

Shimaki is the Cat Knight. He is a man who is very passionate about knowledge and is capable of producing his own golems. 

Subaru is the Rooster Knight who is Yukimachi's best friend. She is the more sensitive of the two and she has a crush on Mikazuki.

Yukimachi is the Turtle Knight who is Subaru's best friend. She is the more boisterous of the two.

Akitani is the Swordfish Knight who has lived for over 500 years. He serves as Subaru and Yukimachi's master.

Tarou is the Mouse Knight. He is a kind high school student who wants to become a chef after graduating and is in love with his childhood friend, Hanako. 

Hanako is the Mantis Knight. A childhood friend of Tarou's, she is an intelligent high school student who is reserved and rarely shows her emotions.

Familiars

Noi is the lizard familiar assigned to Yuuhi. He often lectures Yuuhi and tries to steer him in the right direction.

 Ludo is the dog familiar assigned to Hangetsu. He is intuitive and devoted to his role.

Muu is the crow familiar assigned to Mikazuki. Muu rarely speaks.

Dance is the horse familiar assigned to Souichirou. While he takes his role seriously, he does not like to be ridden.

Shea is the snake familiar assigned to Yayoi. He is supportive of Yayoi and encourages her to be more open about her hobbies and feelings.

Loki is the owl familiar assigned to Taiyou. Despite his cynical nature, he completely supports whatever decision Taiyou's makes. 

Coo is the cat familiar assigned to Shimaki. He is polite and tries to help Shimaki whenever he has a chance.

Lee is the rooster familiar assigned to Subaru. He is very protective of Subaru and is prone to speaking his mind.

Ron is the turtle familiar assigned to Yukimachi. He has a laid-back personality.

Zan is the swordfish familiar assigned to Akitani. Due to his appearance, he tries to warn people when he arrives.

Lance is the mouse familiar assigned to Tarou. He does not get along with Kil.

Kil is the mantis familiar assigned to Hanako. Kil has a cold and ruthless personality.

Others

Anima is a woman who provides the knights their powers. She is trying to stop Animus from destroying the planet.

Animus is the mysterious mage who wants to destroy the planet with the Biscuit Hammer.

Hisame is Samidare's older sister who works as a college professor at Yuuhi and Mikazuki's university.

Media

Manga
Written and illustrated by Satoshi Mizukami, Lucifer and the Biscuit Hammer was serialized in Shōnen Gahōsha's seinen magazine Young King OURs from 28 April 2005 to 30 August 2010. Shōnen Gahōsha collected its chapters in ten tankōbon volumes, released from 27 January 2006 to 30 November 2010.

JManga began publishing the series digitally in North America in February 2012, and published five volumes before the company shut down in May 2013. It was subsequently licensed by Seven Seas Entertainment in November 2013. Crunchyroll added the series to their online catalog in September 2014, and BookWalker added the series on 18 November 2015.

The series has been collected into ten tankōbon volumes, which were published by Seven Seas in five two-in-one omnibus volumes.

Volume list

Anime
An anime television series adaptation was announced on 24 January 2022. The series was produced by NAZ and directed by Nobuaki Nakanishi, with Satoshi Mizukami, the original author, and Yūichirō Momose writing the scripts, Hajime Hatakeyama designing the characters, and Takatsugu Wakabayashi composing the music. It aired from 9 July to 24 December 2022, on the Animeism programming block on MBS, TBS, and BS-TBS. The second opening theme song is "Be the Hero" by Raon. Sano Ibuki performed the second ending theme song "Zero" from Episodes 13–17 and 19–24, while the Pillows performed the third ending theme song  for Episode 18. 

Crunchyroll has licensed the series, and has also began streaming an English dub starting on 22 July 2022. Muse Communication licensed the series in South and Southeast Asia.

Episode list

Reception
In 2011, the series was nominated for the 42nd Seiun Awards in the comics category.

Reviewing the first omnibus volume for Anime News Network, Rebecca Silverman commented that the story "takes a while to hit its stride, but when it does, putting it down becomes difficult", writing that "underneath the goofy start and typically comedic devices of absurdly powerful girls and talking animals, Lucifer and the Biscuit Hammer is hiding a very dark story" which makes it "feel very different from most of the other series currently available in English." She gave it an overall grade of B. Silverman would later list the series as the runner-up for the "Best Reworking of an Old Genre" spot on her 2015 manga retrospective article for Anime News Network. Charlie Jane Anders of io9 placed the series at number ten on her list of "10 Heroic Prophecies That Didn't Turn Out The Way the Heroes Expected".

Notes

References

External links
  at Seven Seas Entertainment
  at Crunchyroll
  at BookWalker
  
 

Adventure anime and manga
Anime and manga about time travel
Anime series based on manga
Animeism
Comedy anime and manga
Crunchyroll anime
Crunchyroll manga
Fantasy anime and manga
Japanese time travel television series
Muse Communication
Naz (studio)
School life in anime and manga
Seinen manga
Seven Seas Entertainment titles
Shōnen Gahōsha manga
Time loop anime and manga